Iriartella is a genus of two species of palms found in northern and northwestern South America (Guyana, Venezuela, Colombia, Peru, and western Brazil; particularly the Acre, Amazonas, Roraima, and Pará states).  The Nukak people of Colombia use Iriartella setigera to fashion blowguns.

Species
 Iriartella stenocarpa Burret
 Iriartella setigera  (Mart.) H.Wendl.

References

Iriarteeae
Flora of South America
Arecaceae genera